New York is the sixth richest state in the United States of America, with a per capita income of $40,272.29  (2004).

New York counties ranked by per capita income 

Note: Data is from the 2010 United States Census Data and the 2006-2010 American Community Survey 5-Year Estimates.

References

New York
Economy of New York (state)
Income